Ulong is a major island and channel of western Palau. It is sometimes called Aulong and originally written Oroolong in English. Ulong is regarded by many as one of the best drift dives in the world.

Geography

Ngerumekaol Pass (also known as Ulong Channel) partially cuts through the reef near the Island. There are sharks within the currents of the channel and Ulong Corner. The channel contains giant clams and one of the largest known patches of green lettuce coral in the world. Denges and Eil Malk Passages are passable, but navigation may be difficult in the lagoon between them and Ulong Island. From Ulong to Malakal Harbor, the lagoon is navigable.

History
Henry Wilson (1740–1810), an English naval captain of the British East India Company was aboard his packet ship Antelope, when it shipwrecked off Ulong Island in 1783; he returned to England with the local Prince Lee Boo. In the late 1700s, the island's inhabitants attempted to defend Ulong from attack along Ikesakes Reef but, having been defeated, were forced to leave. There are Palau Cave Paintings on the island.

References

Islands of Palau
Former monarchies